Anand Rajan is an Indian former first-class cricketer who played for Madhya Pradesh. He is also a member of IPL team Deccan Chargers

References

Living people
1987 births
Indian cricketers
Madhya Pradesh cricketers
Central Zone cricketers
Sunrisers Hyderabad cricketers
Deccan Chargers cricketers